is a song recorded by Japanese singer Maaya Sakamoto, from the album Follow Me Up. It was released as the album's
fourth single on August 20, 2014, through FlyingDog. The song was written by Sakamoto and composed by Takahito Uchisawa from the band Androp. It served as the second opening theme to the Tokyo MX anime series M3: The Dark Metal.

Chart performance
"Replica" debuted on the Oricon Singles Chart at number 17, with 7,000 copies sold in first charting week. The single charted on the chart for four consecutive weeks, selling a reported total of 9,000 copies sold.

Track listing

Credits and personnel
Personnel

 Vocals, backing vocals – Maaya Sakamoto
 Songwriting – Maaya Sakamoto, Takahito Uchisawa
 Arrangement – Takahito Uchisawa, Tōru Ishitsuka
 Bass – Ichiro Yoshida
 Drums – Noriyasu Kawamura
 Guitar, programming – Takahito Uchisawa
 Strings – Tomomi Tokunaga Strings
 Engineering – Takahiro Okubo, Tohru Takayama
 Mixing – Tohru Takayama
 Mastering – Hiroshi Kawasaki

Charts

References

2014 songs
2014 singles
Anime songs
Maaya Sakamoto songs
Songs written by Maaya Sakamoto
FlyingDog singles